Viola caleyana, commonly known as swamp violet, is a perennial shrub of the genus Viola native to southeastern Australia.

References

Flora of New South Wales
Malpighiales of Australia
caleyana